Aleksandar Todorović (born June 10, 1987) is a Bosnian professional basketball player for Gostivar of the Macedonian First League.

Professional career
On August 14, 2017, Todorović signed with Macedonian basketball club Gostivar. On January 3, 2018, Todorović signed with Dynamic Belgrade. On July 14, 2018, he signed for Zrinjski Mostar.

In July 2019, Todorović signed for Novi Pazar.

References

External links
 at Pepi-sport
 at Eurobasket
 at RealGM
 at BGBasket
 at BalkanLeague

1987 births
Living people
BC Beroe players
Bosnia and Herzegovina expatriate basketball people in Serbia
Bosnia and Herzegovina men's basketball players
KK Borac Čačak players
KK Bratunac players
KK Dynamic players
OKK Šabac players
OKK Novi Pazar players
KK Sloga players
People from Bijeljina
Power forwards (basketball)
Serbs of Bosnia and Herzegovina